Vine is an unincorporated community in Fountain County, Indiana, in the United States.

History
A post office was established at Vine in 1895, and remained in operation until it was discontinued in 1900. According to one source, the name Vine was chosen for its brevity.

References

Unincorporated communities in Fountain County, Indiana
Unincorporated communities in Indiana